Omphalius is a genus of sea snails, marine gastropod mollusks in the family Tegulidae.

Since 2020 it is considered a synonym of Tegula Lesson, 1832

Species
Species brought into synonymy:
 Omphalius caelatus Adams A., 1854: synonym of Anadema macandrewii (Mörch, 1868)
 Omphalius globulus Carpenter, 1857: synonym of Tegula globulus (Carpenter, 1857)
 Omphalius marianus Dall, 1919: synonym of Tegula mariana (Dall, 1919)
 Omphalius nigerrimus (Gmelin, 1791): synonym of Tegula nigerrima (Gmelin, 1791)
 Omphalius rusticus (Gmelin, 1791): synonym of Tegula rustica (Gmelin, 1791)

References

 Williams S.T., Karube S. & Ozawa T. (2008) Molecular systematics of Vetigastropoda: Trochidae, Turbinidae and Trochoidea redefined. Zoologica Scripta 37: 483–506

External links
 Philippi, R. A. (1847). Versuch einer systematischen Eintheilung des Geschlechtes Trochus. Zeitschrift für Malakozoologie. 4: 3-11, 17-26
 Herrmannsen, A. N. (1846-1852). Indicis Generum Malacozoorum primordia. Fischer, Cassel. Vol. 1: i-xxviii, 1-637 pp.

Tegulidae